Livia Puljak (born October 25, 1977 in Split, SFR Jugoslavia) is a Croatian scientist and associate professor at the Faculty of Medicine in Split. She is the head of the Department of Histology and Embryology, Faculty of Medicine, Split.

Biography 
Born on October 25, 1977 in Split, she graduated from the Faculty of Medicine in Split in 2002. She completed her three-year postdoctoral training in the United States, at the University of Colorado Health Sciences Center, Denver, Colorado and at the University of Texas Southwestern Medical Center, Dallas, Texas. She received her PhD in 2008 from the Faculty of Medicine in Split. She is an associate professor at the Department of Histology and Embryology, School of Medicine, University of Split.

During her studies, she founded the Split branch of the CroMSIC Student Association, and the Postdoctoral Fellowship in Dallas. Upon returning to Croatia she launched the Croatian branch Cochrane Collaboration and was the first director of the Croatian Cochrane Branch. From 2010 to 2011 she was Vice-Dean for Science at the Faculty of Medicine in Split. She is the head of the PhD program in Translational Research in Biomedicine, and a member of the Board of Directors of the Željko J. Bošnjak Foundation.

Popularization of science 
She is the head of education at the Croatian Cochrane Branch, a member of the organizing committee of the University of Split Science Festival and the organizing committee of the Researchers' Night in Split. Participates in lectures at Brain Week. Within the project of popularization of science of the Ministry of Science and Education of the Republic of Croatia, she translated the book Where is the proof? (Gdje su dokazi?) which was released in March 2014. by Profile.
She is the editor of the portal Evidence in Medicine, and the author of more than 100 scientific papers published in world journals.

Awards and recognition
In 2017. she was awarded The Chris Silagy Prize for an extraordinary contribution to Cochrane work and promotion of medicine based on scientific evidence.

References

External links 
 https://croatia.cochrane.org/hr
 Livia Puljak

1977 births
Living people
Physicians from Split, Croatia
Croatian women scientists
Cochrane Collaboration people